Yana is a tourist destination located in forests of Malenadu region of Uttara Kannada district of Karnataka state in India . Yana is one of the wettest villages in the world. It is the cleanest village in Karnataka, and the second cleanest village in India. The two unique rock outcrops near the village are a tourist attraction and easily approachable by a small trek through  of thick forests from the nearest road head.

Yana is famous for these two massive rock outcrops known as the Bhairaveshwara Shikhara and the Mohini Shikhara ("Shikhara" means "hill"). The huge rocks are composed of solid black, crystalline karst limestone. Yana is also well known as a pilgrimage center because of the cave temple below the Bhairaveshwara Shikhara where a Swayambhu ("self-manifested", or "that which is created by its own accord") linga has been formed. Water drips from the roof over the Linga, adding to the sanctity of the place.

During Shivaratri here, a car festival is held, along with other festivities. The place and its surrounding hillocks are also known for their evergreen scenic forests.

Landscape
The two rock monoliths or hillocks, surrounded by thick forests and streams, rise sharply above the surrounding area near Yana village. They are part of the Sahyadri hill range in the Western Ghats in South India and give a conspicuous identity to Yana and the entire hill range. Within the cave, there is a bronze statue of 'Chandika', an incarnation of the goddess Durga. The cave has a swayambu ("self-manifested") Shiva Linga ("symbol of Shiva") over which spring water trickles from the roof of the tunnel overhead. Emerging as a small stream, called the Chandihole, it eventually merges with the Aghanashini River at Uppinapattana. Local people interpret this as the emergence of the a river, Gangodbhava (emerging Ganges). There are about 61 limestone rock structures, within a radius of 3 km, of which two are of notable size.

The natural creation of the Shiva linga in the cave is attributed by scientists to the geological phenomenon formed by the stalactites and stalagmites in limestone formations.  There was a proposal to utilize the rocks for industries such as a cement factory.

A natural waterfall located at a distance of about 8 km known as Vibhuti Falls ("Vibhuti" means "ashes") also attracts tourists. It is so named because its third drop, stream which is not visible from main viewpoint, is divided to three streams, resembling Vibhuti, it has to be trekked downhill half a kilometre to be reached, visible.

History
Francis Buchanan-Hamilton, a British official of the East India Company, surveyed the site in 1801. At that time, according to his reports, there was a population of more than ten thousand in and around this place. Over the years, people have migrated to other regions to pursue their vocations. At present, the place is inhabited by only a few families, one of them being the Pujari ("priest") family. With a 16 km trek, Yana was a trekker's delight during the 20th century. When a popular Kannada movie, Nammoora Mandara Hoove, was shot here and all-weather road made which provides easy access, the place became famous and attracts thousands of tourists every week.

Legend

Hindu mythology links this place with an event in the life of the Asura, or demon king Bhasmasura. Bhasmasura, by austere penance, obtained a boon from lord Shiva. This boon made it so that when Bhasmasura placed his hand over any one's head, he would burn them up and turn them into ashes (bhasma). It is further narrated that, in order to test his powers, Bhasmasura wanted to place his hands on his patron Lord Shiva's head. He chased Shiva, which unnerved Shiva and prompted him to move from his heavenly abode to earth to seek the help of Lord Vishnu. Vishnu transformed himself to help Shiva, adopting the form of beautiful damsel named Mohini who enticed Bhasmasura with her beauty. Bhasmsura was quite infatuated by Mohini, and agreed to a challenge she issued for a dance competition.

During the dance competition, Mohini cleverly performed a dance bhang ("pose") with hand over head. Without realizing the gravity of this act, the demon king also placed his hand over his head and perished by the fire of his own hands, he was converted into ashes. It is believed that the fire that emanated during this act was so intense that the limestone formations in the Yana area were blackened. The loose black soil or ash seen around the two large rock formations in the area are cited as proof of the legend by devotees who see them as due to the fire and that ashes produced by Bhasmasura death. The two hillocks are also named for this event: the tall peak being Bhairaveshwara Shikhara ("Shiva's hill"), and the smaller peak, a few steps down below, being Mohini Shikhara ("Mohini's hill") where an idol of goddess Parvathi is installed. There are also several other small caves nearby. There is also a Ganesha temple in the vicinity.

Festival
During Maha Shivaratri, annual festivities are held here for 10 days. At this time, devotees (estimated to be around 10,000) on pilgrimage to this place (called 'Bhairava kshetra), after their ablutions, carry holy water from the spring in the cave to a nearby town known as Gokarn for performing Maha Mastaka Abhisheka (pouring libations on the idol of the deity being worshipped) of Mahabaleswara. This has led to a popular saying that devotees rush to Gokarn, for worship whereas people of that town travel to Yana for the same purpose!. In the past, there was also a saying in Kannada that Sokkidhavanu Yanakke hogutaane, rokkiddhavanu Gokarna ke hoguthane, which translated into English means:
The one with tremendous guts and determination goes to Yana and the one with money bags goes to Gokarna, on one’s pilgrimage to Yana.

Requests for special protection status

People of the region have expressed a view that Yana should be declared as a National Natural Heritage site, since it is a historical and a major tourist centre in Uttara Kannada. The place is also considered a biodiversity hotspot of the Sahyadri hill range, and hence it has been suggested that the area be protected under the Biodiversity Preservation Act 2002.

Transportation
The road distances on the NH 17 connecting Yana village are: Kumta - , Sirsi - , Gokarna - , Hubli -  and Mangalore - . The nearest rail head is at Kumta, and the nearest airport is Hubli. The best approach to Yana is from Kumta or Sirsi. A road deviation between these two towns on the highway is near the village of Kathagala. There is also an alternate route to reach Sirsi from Yana via Devanhalli and Mathighatta via Vaddi Ghat. A single lane road was constructed in the thick forest which reduces the trek-length  and drawing more number of tourists.

References

External links 

Villages in Uttara Kannada district
Populated places in the Western Ghats
Rock formations of India
Landforms of Karnataka
Tourist attractions in Uttara Kannada district
Hill stations in Karnataka
Geography of Uttara Kannada district
Karst